Beşiktaş Atatürk Anatolian High School ( or briefly "BAAL") is an Anatolian High School located on the European side of Istanbul and one of the most prominent high schools founded by the first prime minister, İsmet İnönü, in Turkey . The primary languages of instruction are Turkish and English. The secondary foreign languages are German and French.

History
The school was first established under the name "İnönü Ortaokulu" ("İnönü Secondary School") in Beyoğlu, Istanbul in 1936. Two years later, it was turned into a high school and renamed "İnönü Lisesi" ("İnönü High School"). Later in 1945, the school underwent another transformation and took the name "Beyoğlu Kız Lisesi" ("Beyoğlu Girls' High School"), accepting only the female students. In the years 1953 and 1954 the school was renamed twice and continued to give education under the name "İstanbul Atatürk Kız Lisesi" ("Istanbul Atatürk Girls' High School") until 1985. As of 1975, the school gradually transitioned to coeducation. In 1984–85 academic year the school went through a major transformation and received the title "Anatolian High School". From 1985 up to 2005, the school offered a seven-year education including preparatory class.

Notable alumni
 Ahmet Kandemir
 Aylin Aslım 
 Gülten Akın 
 Halit Ergenç 
 Hülya Koçyiğit
 Ece Erken
 Lale Oraloğlu 
 Levent Kazak
 Masis Aram Gözbek
 Nazlı Deniz Kuruoğlu
 Özkan Manav
 Sibel Tüzün 
 Suna Selen

See also
 List of schools in Istanbul

References
 BAAL - [ Brief History of Beşiktaş Atatürk Anadolu Lisesi]

External links 
 BAAL - Resmi web sitesi
 [ AKL/BAL/BAAL - Mezunlar derneği web sitesi]

External links
 
 [ BAAL - Alumni association's website]

High schools in Istanbul
Educational institutions established in 1936
Beşiktaş
1936 establishments in Turkey
Things named after Mustafa Kemal Atatürk